Agachkala is a rural locality (a selo) in Verkhnekazanishchensky Selsoviet, Buynaksky District, Republic of Dagestan, Russia. The population was 450 as of 2010. There are 9 streets.

Geography 
Agachkala is located 9 km southwest of Buynaksk (the district's administrative centre) by road, on the left bank of the Akleozen River. Manasaul is the nearest rural locality.

References 

Rural localities in Buynaksky District